Rainforest toad may refer to:

 Campbell's rainforest toad (Incilius campbelli), a frog in the family Bufonidae found in Belize, Guatemala, and Honduras
 Siegfried's rainforest toad (Albericus siegfriedi), a frog in the family Microhylidae endemic to Papua New Guinea

Animal common name disambiguation pages